Phansidewa Assembly constituency is an assembly constituency in Darjeeling district in the Indian state of West Bengal. It is reserved for scheduled tribes.

Overview
As per orders of the Delimitation Commission, No. 27 Phansidewa Assembly constituency (ST) covers Phansidewa and Kharibari community development blocks.

Phansidewa Assembly constituency is part of No. 4 Darjeeling (Lok Sabha constituency). 

Communist Party of India (Marxist) & Indian National Congress are the major political parties of this constituency.

Members of Legislative Assembly

Election results

2021 Election

In the 2021 West Bengal Legislative Assembly election, Durga Murmu of BJP defeated his nearest rival Choton Kisku of TMC.

2016 Election

In the 2016 West Bengal Legislative Assembly election, Sunil Chandra Tirkey of Congress defeated his nearest rival Carolus Lakra of TMC.

2011 Election

In the 2011 West Bengal Legislative Assembly election, Sunil Chandra Tirkey of Congress defeated his nearest rival Chhotan Kiksu of CPI(M).

2011-2021

In the 2011 West Bengal Legislative Assembly election, Sunil Chandra Tirkey of Indian National Congress won the Phansidewa (ST) assembly seat defeating his nearest rival Choton Kisku of Communist Party of India (Marxist).In 2016 West Bengal Legislative Assembly election ,Sunil Chandra Tirkey defeated his nearest rival Carlous Lakra of Trinamool Congress and again became MLA for another five years.In 2021 West Bengal Legislative Assembly election ,Durga Murmu of Bharatiya Janata Party defeated his nearest rival Choton Kisku of Trinamool Congress and became MLA of Phansidewa (ST) assembly constituency.

1977–2006
In the 2006 state assembly elections, Choton Kisku of CPI(M) won the Phansidewa (ST) assembly seat defeating his nearest rival Mamla Kujur of Congress. Contests in most years were multi cornered but only winners and runners are being mentioned. Prakash Minj of CPI(M) defeated Mamla Kujur of Congress in 2001. Prokash Minz of CPI(M) defeated Chhabilal Minj of Congress in 1996, and Iswar Chandra Tirkey of Congress in 1991 and 1987. Patras Minj of CPI(M) defeated Iswar Chandra Tirkey of Congress in 1982 and Chacko Toresa Soreng of Janata Party in 1977.

1962–1972
Iswar Chandra Tirkey of Congress won in 1972, 1971, and 1969. Tenzing Wangdi of Congress won in 1967 and 1962. Prior to that, the Phansidewa seat did not exist.

References

Assembly constituencies of West Bengal
Politics of Darjeeling district